Politotdel may refer to:
Politotdel, Kazakhstan, a village in the Almaty Province, Kazakhstan
Politotdel, Russia, name of several rural localities in Russia